Marshall Dodge (1935–1982) was a Maine humorist.

Early life 
Dodge was born in New York City, attended high school in New Hampshire, and graduated from Yale University with a degree in philosophy.

Career 
Dodge and his associate, Robert Bryan (1931 – 2018), put out several defining albums of Maine humor, starting with Bert & I, released in 1958. In 1964, he and Noel Parmentel published (with accompanying LP record) a parody of popular folk songs titled Folk Songs for Conservatives.

During the early 1970s, Dodge performed at various clubs around New England, including in Mystic, Ct. In 1976, he founded the Maine Festival of the Arts at Bowdoin College. In a 1979 interview, Dodge claimed that his real love was philosophy, and that he was writing a book on the subject.

Death
Dodge died in a hit-and-run accident in 1982 in Waimea, Hawaii.

References

External links
A Downeast Smile-In: The Farm  Documentary produced by Maine Public Broadcasting Network
A Downeast Smile-In: The Sea  Documentary produced by Maine Public Broadcasting Network
A Maine Writer: Dodge, Marshall (1935 - 1982) from Maine State Library

1935 births
1982 deaths
American humorists
Comedians from Maine
Road incident deaths in Hawaii
Writers from Maine
Comedians from New York City
Writers from New York City
20th-century American writers
20th-century American male writers
Yale College alumni